Podpraporshchik was a Russian non-commissioned officer (NCO) rank, originally below the Sergeant and Feldwebel. From 1826 to 1884 it became the highest NCO rank of the infantry, cavalry, and Leib Guard. From 1884, podpraporshchik ranked below the newly introduced NCO-grade zauryad-praporshchik.

Branch of service, rank and rank insignia 

See also
History of Russian military ranks
Ranks and rank insignia of the Imperial Russian Army until 1917

See also
History of Russian military ranks
Ranks and rank insignia of the Imperial Russian Army until 1917

References 

Military ranks of Russia